Agnippe zhouzhiensis is a moth of the family Gelechiidae. It is found in China (Shaanxi) and Russia (Primorsky Region).

The wingspan is 9–10.1 mm. The forewings have black basal and large black medial patches from the costa to the posterior margin. The hindwings are light grey. Adults are on wing from July to August.

References

Moths described in 1993
Agnippe
Moths of Asia